South Korean web culture indicates distinct activities that South Korean Internet users enjoy on the web. Most of the Internet users are in the 13–50 age range. People often access the Internet through cyber cafes (Korean: PC방; PC bang).

Most of the activities are targeted to teenagers and college students. Youngsters who feel more comfortable texting than talking are known as the "thumb tribe". The LG Mobile World Cup, an international competition held on January 14, 2010, in which participants competed using their texting speed and accuracy was won by a pair of South Koreans.

Highly urbanized at 92%, South Koreans lead a distinctive urban lifestyle; half of them live in high-rises concentrated in the Seoul Capital Area with 25 million residents. The rise of online social activities closely mirrors the wider cultural trend towards shared spaces, such as the habitual use of coffee houses.

South Korea enjoys the world's swiftest Internet speeds and the highest rate of Internet penetration but also suffers from very high censorship of content.

Major activities

Video games as spectator sports 

Video games and the watching of video games is very popular. South Korea leads the world in video games as spectator sports.

Blizzard entered into a co-marketing agreement with Korean Air that lasted for six months, in which two of the airline's airplanes on both domestic and international routes prominently displayed StarCraft II advertising featuring Jim Raynor on the fuselage.

This popularity has led to a natural rise in popular commentators on web games as part of the wider blogging community.

Blog (블로그) 
Just like other countries, blogging is also popular in South Korea. Post topics range from personal reflections on philosophical conjectures to simple everyday life stories. Some of the popular Korean blog hosting websites include Naver Blog, Egloos, Blogin, Daum Blog, Yahoo! Korea Blog, Tistory, and Textcube.com.

Instant messaging (메신저) 

In Korea, the most popular online messengers include NateOn, KakaoTalk, MSN Messenger, BuddyBuddy, Sayclub Tachy and more. NateOn is known to have surpassed the usage share of MSN, now claiming the most number of users among messengers used in Korea.

Q&A 

Some search engine websites also provide "knowledge searches", which is an answer to a question that has been asked by another search engine user. For example, in Naver Knowledge iN registered users can post a question on any topic of their choice. Some users ask very personal questions pertaining to relationships and the like, since the user's real identity is not exposed.

When various users answer a question they are awarded a certain number of points, the person who asked the question can then select the best answer and will be awarded points. This user can then ask questions on the website using the points that he/she was awarded. The users with most points are ranked daily with the option to display their real identities, if they choose to do so.

Unlike Wikipedia, Q&A promotes a very active community based atmosphere for questions and answers.

Webtoons

"Webtoon" (Hangul: 웹툰, RR: wep-tun) is a South Korean webcomic, or manhwa that is published online. The Korean web portal Daum created a webtoon service in 2003, as did Naver in 2004. These services regularly release webtoons that are available for free. According to David Welsh of Bloomberg, comics account for a quarter of all book sales in South Korea, while more than 3 million Korean users paid to access online manhwa and 10 million users read free webcomics.

, Naver had published 520 webtoons while Daum had published 434. Since the early 2010s, services such as Tapastic and Line Webtoon have begun to officially translate webtoons into English. Examples of popular webtoons that have been translated into English are The Breaker, Girls of the Wild's, The Gamer, Noblesse, The God of High School, and Tower of God. In recent years, these webtoons have been gaining popularity in Western markets, rivalling Japanese manga.

As digital comics have emerged as a popular medium, print publication of manhwa has decreased. The amount of material published in webtoon form has now reached an equal amount as that published offline.

File sharing 

In Korea, there are many P2Ps like Soribada, Pruna, eMule etc..

Online video 
South Koreans appear to be avid users of online video with thousands watching online stars doing everyday things like eating.

South Korea has become something of a cultural giant exporting music (K-Pop) through web-based viral success. A notable worldwide success from this approach is Gangnam Style and by September 2012 entered the Guinness World Records as the most "liked" video on YouTube.

Social media 

Social media has been instrumental in the global reach of K-Pop, particularly video-sharing site YouTube. Of the 2.28 billion worldwide K-pop YouTube views in 2011, 240 million came from the United States, more than double the figure from 2010 (94 million).

Virtual community 

In Korea, there's many virtual communities like Daum Cafe, Naver Cafe, etc..

Cyworld (싸이월드) 

Cyworld is a hybrid between a blog and personal homepage. Although its primary prevalence is found in Korea, its influence has spread over China in recent years. Cyworld users range anywhere from elementary students to middle-aged adults.

Cyworld requires a person's real identity (Koreans: verified by Korean national identification number (주민등록번호); Foreigners: scanned school/state ID, driver's license, or passport) to become a member. Since all identity is usually truthful and non-anonymous, users often use this to seek lost friends from childhood or former classmates on the website, or make and progress their friendship by system that called by 'mini-homepage (minihompy, 미니홈피)'.

Similar to blogs, many people share their thoughts and photos that other friends (called 일촌, il-chon) can comment on. A typical 'mini-homepage' features a main page, a photographic album, a guest book, and a personal diary. Users are given many choices for personalizing their pages with music, backgrounds, and even fonts. One of the major differences between Cyworld and blogs is that Cyworld is optimized for the users who prefer to write very short and succinct diaries. One popular personalized feature is the 'mini-room (미니룸)', where a user is given a single rectangular room to decorate with different objects. These objects (as well as personalized features) are bought with online dollars called dotori (acorn, in English). Every user is given a 'mini-me (미니미)', a caricature. Although each user is given a prototype, gender-appropriate figure, they liberally personalize these figures with a variety of dress and hairstyle options.

Because the website contains mostly truthful information, social issues have been raised such as Cyber-bullying.

Web page usability

Most Korean webpages (such as weather, search engine Naver and news) incorporate Flash and images, preferably animated. Often text is substituted with images in such a way that in order to copy and/or translate it visitor has to type it manually or, in the best case, take it from alternate text of the image. The impression is that widespread broadband created a stimulus for web developers to write overly complex and rich web-pages, which can even make the browser work slowly (when about twenty pages are opened at once). At the same time, the webpages can sometimes in one aspect or the other deviate from standard: Naver is too narrow on some screens, some pages throw several pop-ups at the user, introduction on Korean website because it's all in images, etc..

See also 
 Cyber defamation law

References

Internet culture
Internet in South Korea
South Korean popular culture